{{DISPLAYTITLE:C21H27FO5}}
The molecular formula C21H27FO5 (molar mass: 378.43 g/mol) may refer to:

 Descinolone
 9α-Fluorocortisone, or alfuorone
 Fluprednisolone
 Isoflupredone

Molecular formulas